YPC Shari-Eli is an unaffiliated synagogue located in the Whitman neighborhood of South Philadelphia. Congregational services are lay-led. YPC Shari Eli was founded in 1948. It is South Philadelphia's last active Conservative synagogue and only synagogue located south of Snyder Avenue.

Congregation History
Young People's Congregation (YPC) Shari-Eli was founded in 1948 when a group of younger members of Shaari Eliohu (8th and Porter Streets), under the leadership of Kelman Israel, broke away, formed a Conservative congregation, and moved into the building of the former Shaare Torah synagogue at Franklin Street and Moyamensing Avenue. YPC Shari-Eli established a building fund in 1953 with a goal to raise $25,000.

Shari Eli remodeled its building in 1961. The congregation replaced the removable ceiling opening to the second-floor women's section balcony with a permanent ceiling. Israel Wolmark became the congregation's part-time rabbi in 1973  and served for approximately thirty years.

See also

History of the Jews in Philadelphia: Jewish Quarter of Philadelphia

References

External links 
Facebook/YPC Shari-Eli
Jewish Exponent/YPC Shari-Eli

20th-century synagogues
Jews and Judaism in Philadelphia
South Philadelphia
Conservative synagogues in Pennsylvania
Synagogues in Philadelphia
Tourist attractions in Philadelphia